Carex maritima, called the curved sedge, is a species of flowering plant in the genus Carex, with a bipolar distribution in mountains and cold regions. It dispersed in the Pleistocene from the northern to the southern hemisphere.

References

maritima
Plants described in 1776